Everlasting God is Christian worship leader and songwriter Brenton Brown's first solo album, and solo-track that has gained popularity worldwide, written by Brown and Ken Riley, lead vocalist of a British alternative CCM band YFriday released on 17 February 2006.

Track listing
"Hosanna (Praise Is Rising)" (Brenton Brown, Paul Baloche) - 4:33
"I Will Remember You" (Brown) - 4:17
"Everlasting God" (Brown, Ken Riley) - 4:47
"Jesus, You Are Worthy" (Brown, Don Williams) - 4:13
"You Are My God" (Brown) - 4:48	
"We Will Worship Him" (Brown) - 4:36
"Lord, Reign in Me" (Brown) - 3:33
"Hallelujah (Your Love Is Amazing)" (Brown, Brian Doerksen) - 3:26
"So Alive" (Brown) - 3:57
"Not Going Back" (Brown) - 0:50
"Like the Angels" (Brown) - 4:31
"Well with My Soul" (Brown, Daniel Ornellas, Horatio Spafford, Philip Bliss) - 4:16
"We Will Go" (Brown, Jude Brown) - 4:05

Personnel 
 Brenton Brown – lead vocals, acoustic guitar (12), electric guitar (12), backing vocals (12)
 Nathan Nockels – acoustic piano (1-9, 11, 13), keyboards (1-9, 11, 13), programming (1-9, 11, 13), acoustic guitar (1-9, 11, 13), electric guitar (1-9, 11, 13), backing vocals (1-9, 11, 13)
 Jeremy Bose – programming (1-9, 11, 13)
 Hanif Williams – keyboards (12), additional programming (12), acoustic guitar (12), electric guitar (12), arrangements (12), additional string arrangements (12), backing vocals (12)
 Gary Burnette – electric guitar (1-9, 11, 13)
 Paul Moak – electric guitar (1-9, 11, 13)
 Rashid Williams – acoustic guitar (12), electric guitar (12), bass (12)
 Matt Pierson – bass (1, 2, 4-9, 11, 13)
 Calvin Turner – bass (3)
 Matt King – drums (1, 2, 4-9, 11, 13)
 Dan Needham – drums (3)
 Philip Booh – drums (12)
 Ken Lewis – percussion (1-9, 11, 13)
 Keith Getty – string arrangements (12)
 Ladysmith Black Mambazo – additional vocals (6)
 Marc James – backing vocals (10)
 Quintin Dellport – backing vocals (10)

Choir (Tracks 1-9, 11 & 13)
 Lisa Bevill
 Travis Cottrell
 Nirva Dorsaint
 Mandisa Hundley
 Michael Mellett

Production 
 Les Moir – executive producer 
 Brad O'Donnell – executive producer
 Nathan Nockels – producer (1-9, 11, 13), overdub recording (1-9, 11, 13)
 Brenton Brown – producer (10), recording (10)
 Hanif Williams – producer (12), mixing (12)
 Tom Laune – recording (1, 2, 4-9, 11, 13)
 Joe Baldridge – recording (3)
 Stephen Lotz – recording assistant (1, 2, 4-9, 11, 13)
 Nick Fairclough – additional vocal recording (6)
 Shane Wilson – mixing (1-9, 11, 13)
 Rashid Williams – track adjustments (12)
 Hank Williams – mastering 
 Alicia Lewis – production assistant (1-9, 11, 13)
 Jan Cook – art direction 
 Marcus Melton – art direction, design 
 Joel Flory – photography 
 Dougal Paterson – photography
 David K. – stylist

Personnel 
 Brenton Brown – lead vocals, acoustic guitar (12), electric guitar (12), backing vocals (12)
 Nathan Nockels – acoustic piano (1-9, 11, 13), keyboards (1-9, 11, 13), programming (1-9, 11, 13), acoustic guitar (1-9, 11, 13), electric guitar (1-9, 11, 13), backing vocals (1-9, 11, 13)
 Jeremy Bose – programming (1-9, 11, 13)
 Hanif Williams – keyboards (12), additional programming (12), acoustic guitar (12), electric guitar (12), arrangements (12), additional string arrangements (12), backing vocals (12)
 Gary Burnette – electric guitar (1-9, 11, 13)
 Paul Moak – electric guitar (1-9, 11, 13)
 Rashid Williams – acoustic guitar (12), electric guitar (12), bass (12)
 Matt Pierson – bass (1, 2, 4-9, 11, 13)
 Calvin Turner – bass (3)
 Matt King – drums (1, 2, 4-9, 11, 13)
 Dan Needham – drums (3)
 Philip Booh – drums (12)
 Ken Lewis – percussion (1-9, 11, 13)
 Keith Getty – string arrangements (12)
 Ladysmith Black Mambazo – additional vocals (6)
 Marc James – backing vocals (10)
 Quintin Dellport – backing vocals (10)

Choir (Tracks 1-9, 11 & 13)
 Lisa Bevill
 Travis Cottrell
 Nirva Dorsaint
 Mandisa Hundley
 Michael Mellett

Production 
 Les Moir – executive producer 
 Brad O'Donnell – executive producer
 Nathan Nockels – producer (1-9, 11, 13), overdub recording (1-9, 11, 13)
 Brenton Brown – producer (10), recording (10)
 Hanif Williams – producer (12), mixing (12)
 Tom Laune – recording (1, 2, 4-9, 11, 13)
 Joe Baldridge – recording (3)
 Stephen Lotz – recording assistant (1, 2, 4-9, 11, 13)
 Nick Fairclough – additional vocal recording (6)
 Shane Wilson – mixing (1-9, 11, 13)
 Rashid Williams – track adjustments (12)
 Hank Williams – mastering 
 Alicia Lewis – production assistant (1-9, 11, 13)
 Jan Cook – art direction 
 Marcus Melton – art direction, design 
 Joel Flory – photography 
 Dougal Paterson – photography
 David K. – stylist

Popularity
The popularity of the title track led to it being recorded by other artists like Chris Tomlin, Jeremy Camp and Lincoln Brewster whose version has topped the US CCM chart.

Awards

In 2008, the title song was nominated for a Dove Award for Worship Song of the Year at the 39th GMA Dove Awards.

References

Brenton Brown albums
2006 albums